Boris Yevdokimovich Shcherbina (5 October 1919 – 22 August 1990) was a Ukrainian Soviet politician who served as a Deputy Chairman of the Council of Ministers of the Soviet Union from 1984 to 1989. During this period he supervised Soviet crisis management of two major catastrophes: the 1986 Chernobyl disaster and the 1988 Armenian earthquake.

Life 
Shcherbina was born in Debaltsevo, Ukrainian SSR (now Debaltseve, Donetsk Oblast, Ukraine) on October 5, 1919 to the family of a Ukrainian railroad worker. He joined the CPSU in 1939 and volunteered for army service during the Winter War with Finland. He was married to Raisa Pavlovna and the two had one son, Yuri Borisovich.

Shcherbina is credited with co-founding the oil and gas industry in Western Siberia while serving as the CPSU first secretary in Tyumen Oblast and later as the Minister of Construction of Oil and Gas Industries (1973–1984). In 1976, Shcherbina had become a member of the Central Committee of the Communist Party of the Soviet Union and kept the position until his death.

In 1984, he became a Deputy Chairman of the Council of Ministers and as such was in charge of dealing with the Chernobyl disaster outcome in 1986. Shcherbina served in a similar role after the catastrophic 1988 Armenian earthquake. He proposed inviting international rescuers – from Austria and Czechoslovakia – who had thermal imagers and specially trained dogs at their disposal to search for living people.

In 1990, he opposed the election of Boris Yeltsin to the chairmanship of the Supreme Soviet of the RSFSR, describing him as "a man of low moral qualities", whose election would "pave the way for the darkest period in our country's history".

Death 
Shcherbina died in Moscow in 1990, aged 70. It is unclear if his death was related to radiation as a 1988 decree, drafted by himself, prevented Soviet doctors from citing radiation as a cause of death or illness.

Honors and awards 
In his position of Minister of Oil and Gas, he was awarded the honorific title of Hero of Socialist Labour for major contributions to the development of the country's oil and gas industry, which was the highest award for achievements within the national economy. During his life, he was also awarded four Orders of Lenin, the Order of the October Revolution and two Orders of the Red Banner of Labour.

In Gyumri, Armenia, a street was named after him in his honour. On 10 November 2004, a bust of Shcherbina was erected in Nikolai Nemtsov Square in Tyumen, Tyumen Oblast.

In popular culture 
Shcherbina is portrayed by Vernon Dobtcheff in the BBC docudrama Surviving Disaster (2006) and by Stellan Skarsgård in the Sky/HBO miniseries Chernobyl (2019).

References 

1919 births
1990 deaths
Burials at Novodevichy Cemetery
Central Committee of the Communist Party of the Soviet Union members
Eighth convocation members of the Supreme Soviet of the Soviet Union
Eleventh convocation members of the Supreme Soviet of the Soviet Union
Heroes of Socialist Labour
Ninth convocation members of the Supreme Soviet of the Soviet Union
People associated with the Chernobyl disaster
People from Debaltseve
People from Yekaterinoslav Governorate
People of the Winter War
People's commissars and ministers of the Soviet Union
Recipients of the Order of Lenin
Seventh convocation members of the Supreme Soviet of the Soviet Union
Sixth convocation members of the Supreme Soviet of the Soviet Union
Tenth convocation members of the Supreme Soviet of the Soviet Union